Neunkirchen is a municipality in the Miltenberg district in the Regierungsbezirk of Lower Franconia (Unterfranken) in Bavaria, Germany and a member of the Verwaltungsgemeinschaft (Administrative Community) of Erftal, whose seat is in Bürgstadt.

Geography

Location 
The rural residential community of Neunkirchen lies in the Geo-Naturpark Bergstraße-Odenwald, between Wertheim and Miltenberg.

Constituent communities 
Neunkirchen's Ortsteile are Neunkirchen, Richelbach and Umpfenbach.

History 
In 1232, Neunkirchen had its first documentary mention, and for the longest time in its history had the Archbishopric of Mainz as its overlord. It was said to be a well-off farming community.

Amalgamations 
The greater community of Neunkirchen came into being through the merger of the formerly self-administering communities of Neunkirchen, Richelbach and Umpfenbach on 1 July 1975.

Politics

Town council 

The council is made up of 13 council members, counting the part-time mayor.

(as at municipal election held on 3 March 2002)

Coat of arms 
The community's arms might be described thus: Per chevron embowed, argent dexter a helm in profile and sinister the head of an abbess's staff gules, and gules a wheel spoked of six of the first.

The knight's helmet stands for Umpfenbach, much of whose mediaeval history was characterized by Imperial, knightly fiefholders, the most important among whom were the Barons of Gudenus. They acquired the community quite late in Imperial history, in 1775 and rendered service thereto on into the 20th century. The abbess's staff refers to Richelbach's relationship with the Altmünster Convent, which was founded in the 8th century and known to have been in Riclelbach by the 13th century. The founding Abbess, Bihildis, is Richelbach's church patron. The Wheel of Mainz, and also the tinctures argent and gules (silver and red) refer to the community's long association with the Electoral state of Mainz, which was landlord to almost all of Neunkirchen and the authority that dispensed law.

The arms have been borne since 1982.

Famous people

Honorary citizens 
1898: Bishop Ferdinand von Schlör, Richelbach 
1967: Headteacher Alfred Hauck, Richelbach 
1975: Former Mayor Helmut Schell, Neunkirchen 
1979: Father Georg Zenkert, Neunkirchen 
1985: Former Mayor Rudolf Ditter, Richelbach 
2003: Honorary Councillor Fritz Schmidt, Umpfenbach
2006: Honorary Councillor Alfons Wolf, Neunkirchen

References

External links 

 Community’s official webpage 

Miltenberg (district)